The 2022 Nevada State Controller election took place on November 8, 2022, to elect the next Nevada State Controller. Incumbent Democratic Controller Catherine Byrne did not seek re-election to a second term.

Democratic primary

Candidates

Nominee
Ellen Spiegel, former state assemblywoman (2012–2020)

Eliminated in primary
Alex Costa, investor

Results

Republican primary

Candidates

Nominee
Andy Matthews, state assemblyman (2020–present)

Independents and third-party candidates

Candidates

Nominees
Jed Profeta (Libertarian)

General election

Polling

Results

Notes

References

External links
Official campaign websites
Andy Matthews (R) for State Controller
Ellen Spiegel (D) for State Controller

State Controller
Nevada